Eye to Ear is a studio album by English guitarist, composer and improvisor Fred Frith. It is a collection of film and theatre music composed and performed by Frith, and was recorded in Germany and the United States between 1992 and 1995. Eye to Ear was Frith's first solo album to be released on John Zorn's Tzadik label.

Two more collections of film and theatre music by Frith in this series, Eye to Ear II and Eye to Ear III were released by Tzadik Records in 2004 and 2010 respectively.

Track listing
All tracks composed by Fred Frith.

Personnel
Fred Frith – all instruments (except those listed below), tape manipulations
Michaela Dietl – accordion (3,6)
Tilmann Müller – trumpet (3,6)
Christian Kaya – clarinet (3)
Boris Denker – tenor saxophone (1,9)
Willy Webster – organ (2,4,7)

Sound
Tracks 1, 3, 6 and 9 recorded by Beno Gordon at Sound Fabrik, Munich, Germany, 1992
Tracks 2, 4, 5 and 7 recorded by Olivier Dicicco at Mobius Studio, San Francisco, United States, 1994–1995
Track 8 recorded by Peter Hardt at Jankowski Studio, Stuttgart, Germany, 1995

References

External links
Discogs. Eye to Ear.

1997 albums
Fred Frith albums
Tzadik Records albums
Albums produced by Fred Frith